Aneflomorpha fisheri is a species of beetle in the family Cerambycidae. It was described by Linsley in 1936.

References

Aneflomorpha
Beetles described in 1936